Colonel Rufat Amirov is a retired military officer who had served as the acting Chief of General Staff of Azerbaijani Armed Forces and Deputy Minister of Defense of Azerbaijan Republic. He was appointed to both positions in 1992 after General Major Shahin Musayev was removed. He was then replaced by Lieutenant General Valeh Barshadly as Chief of General Staff but continued as Deputy Defense Minister through 1996.

Amirov is currently a reserve officer and Director of Military History Museum of the Ministry of Defense of Azerbaijan Republic.

See also
Azerbaijani Army
Ministers of Defense of Azerbaijan Republic
Safar Abiyev

References

Azerbaijani generals
Living people
Chiefs of General Staff of Azerbaijani Armed Forces
Year of birth missing (living people)